Nematobrycon is a genus of characins endemic to the Atrato and San Juan River basins in western Colombia.  The two described species in this genus are very popular aquarium fish.

Species 
 Nematobrycon lacortei S. H. Weitzman & W. L. Fink, 1971 (rainbow tetra)
 Nematobrycon palmeri C. H. Eigenmann, 1911 (emperor tetra)

References 
 

Characidae
Taxa named by Carl H. Eigenmann
Endemic fauna of Colombia
Freshwater fish of Colombia
Characiformes genera